Cooder is a surname. Notable people with the surname include:

Joachim Cooder (born 1978), American drummer, percussionist, and keyboardist, son of Ry
Ry Cooder (born 1947), American musician, songwriter, film score composer, and record producer

See also
Cooper (surname)
Coover